Darrel Earl Jones (born July 19, 1957 in Tuscaloosa, Alabama) is a former American football cornerback in the National Football League. He was drafted by the Atlanta Falcons in the 3rd round of the 1980 NFL Draft. Jones played college football at Norfolk State.

References

Living people
1957 births
Atlanta Falcons players